59th meridian may refer to:

59th meridian east, a line of longitude east of the Greenwich Meridian
59th meridian west, a line of longitude west of the Greenwich Meridian

Meridian 59, an online computer role-playing game